Zhang Shichang (born 5 January 1989) is a Chinese professional football player who currently plays for Sichuan Longfor in the China League One.

Club career
Zhang began his football career at Tianjin Locomotive and transferred to Portuguese Liga side Belenenses in 2007. But he did not establish himself in the Belenenses youth squad and returned to China in the summer of 2008. Then he was signed by Henan Construction.
Zhang started his professional career in 2009. On 31 October 2009, he made his senior debut for Henan as a substitution, with the regular goalkeeper Zeng Cheng sent off in 47th minute.
In February 2014, Zhang transferred to Chinese Super League side Guangzhou R&F.

On 7 February 2017, Zhang moved to League Two side Sichuan Longfor.

References

External links
 
Player profile at Sodasoccer.com
Player stats at Sohu.com

1989 births
Living people
Chinese footballers
Footballers from Beijing
Association football goalkeepers
Chinese expatriates in Portugal
Henan Songshan Longmen F.C. players
Shenzhen F.C. players
Guangzhou City F.C. players
Sichuan Longfor F.C. players
Chinese Super League players
China League One players
Footballers at the 2010 Asian Games
Asian Games competitors for China